Kindred Spirits is a large stainless steel outdoor sculpture in Bailick Park in Midleton, County Cork, Ireland.

Kindred Spirits commemorates the 1847 donation by the Native American Choctaw People to Irish famine relief during the Great Hunger, despite the Choctaw themselves living in hardship and poverty and having recently endured the Trail of Tears. In the U.S. coinage of the time, U.S.$170 meant 8.22 troy ounces of physical gold, or about US$14,000 in 2020 prices.

The sculpture consists of nine  stainless steel eagle feathers arranged in a circle, no two feathers being identical, forming a bowl shape to represent a gift of a bowl of food. It was created by Alex Pentek at the Sculpture Factory in Cork, Ireland, with assistance from students of the Crawford College of Art and Design, and installed in Bailick Park in 2015. The memorial was commissioned by Midleton Town Council, and was officially unveiled and dedicated in June 2017 by Chief Gary Batton, Chief of the Choctaw Nation, Assistant Chief Jack Austin Jr., and Councillor Seamus McGrath, County Mayor of Cork, accompanied by a 20-strong delegation from the Choctaw Nation.

See also
 Feathers in Religion and Culture

Notes

References

Outdoor sculptures in Ireland
Monuments and memorials in the Republic of Ireland
Stainless steel sculptures
2015 sculptures
Choctaw Nation of Oklahoma
Ireland–United States relations